released in Europe as Sonic Drift Racing, is a kart racing video game by Sega for the Game Gear. The sequel to Sonic Drift, it was released in Japan and Europe in March 1995 and in North America in November 1995. It added three characters: Knuckles, Fang the Sniper, and Metal Sonic, and marked the first time the last two were playable characters.

Gameplay

The gameplay is similar to Sonic Drift, but with minor changes. In the Chaos GP mode, players are awarded with Chaos Emeralds should they come in 1st within a GP. Alongside Sonic, Tails, Amy, and Dr. Eggman, there are three additional playable characters: Metal Sonic, Fang, and Knuckles.

Metal Sonic drives the Blue Devil, a convertible sports car with high speed and bad handling. His special ability is the High-Speed Dash, but unlike Sonic's High-Speed Dash, it requires 3 rings to use and is much more powerful. Fang drives the Marvelous Queen, a modified airbike with good speed and acceleration, but has poor handling. He also tosses Oil Balls that make opponents spin out after a while. Knuckles drives the Tempest, a car based on the Hummer H1 that has balanced stats. Unlike most characters, Knuckles has two abilities in the game. He can punch nearby racers to make them spin out and drop a ring, but if there are none nearby, he will jump.

Reception
Like its predecessor, Sonic Drift 2 was met with mixed to negative reviews from critics. On release, Famicom Tsūshin scored the game a 19 out of 40. GamePros Sir Garnabus commented that, "Hairpin turns, bombs in the road, and competitors who never give up make Sonic Drift 2 Game Gear racing at its best." He also praised the detailed graphics, controls, and the use of a different musical piece for each track. Its inclusion in Sonic Gems Collection was negatively reviewed. In a review of the Sonic Gems Collection compilation, GameSpot described the game as "basically unplayable because of poor handling and a really short horizon".

Notes

References

External links
Official Nintendo website 
Official Sega Webpage 

1995 video games
Sega video games
Game Gear games
Game Gear-only games
Kart racing video games
Racing video games
Video games scored by Saori Kobayashi
Virtual Console games
Single-player video games
Sonic the Hedgehog spin-off games
Video games developed in Japan
Arc System Works games